Chae Sung-bae (born December 16, 1968 in Gwangju, South Korea) is a former South Korean heavyweight amateur boxer.

Results

1991 World Championships

1992 AIBA Challenge Matches

1992 Summer Olympics

References
 

Living people
Boxers at the 1992 Summer Olympics
Olympic boxers of South Korea
1968 births
Asian Games medalists in boxing
Boxers at the 1994 Asian Games
Boxers at the 1990 Asian Games
South Korean male boxers
AIBA World Boxing Championships medalists
Asian Games gold medalists for South Korea
Medalists at the 1990 Asian Games
Heavyweight boxers
Sportspeople from Gwangju